Londa may refer to:

People 
 Maria Natalia Londa (born 1990), Indonesian athlete
 Londa Larmond (born 1975), Canadian musician
 Londa Schiebinger (born 1952), American historian

Places 
Londa, Bangladesh
Londa, Karnataka, India
Londa, Tuscany, Italy